My Medicine may refer to:

"My Medicine" (song), a 2008 song by Snoop Dogg
"My Medicine", a song by The Pretty Reckless from the 2010 album Light Me Up
My Medicine, a 2002 album by Wilt (band)
"My Medicine", the album's title song